Tranøy or Tranøya may refer to:

People with the surname
Knut Erik Tranøy (1918–2012), Norwegian philosopher
Torstein Tranøy (1964–2009), Norwegian journalist and writer

Places

Norway

Municipalities
Tranøy, a former municipality in Troms county, Norway

Villages
Tranøy, Hamarøy, a village in Hamarøy municipality in Nordland county, Norway

Islands
Tranøya (Alstahaug), an island in Alstahaug municipality, Nordland county, Norway
Tranøya (Dønna), an island in Dønna municipality, Nordland county, Norway
Tranøya (Lurøy), an island in Lurøy municipality, Nordland county, Norway
Tranøya (Møre og Romsdal), an island in Smøla municipality, Møre og Romsdal county, Norway
Tranøya (Troms), an island in Senja municipality, Troms og Finnmark county, Norway
Tranøya (Vestland), an island in Fitjar municipality, Vestland county, Norway

Other
Tranøy Church, a historic parish church on the island of Tranøya in Senja municipality, Troms og Finnmark county, Norway
Tranøy Lighthouse, a lighthouse in Hamarøy municipality, Nordland county, Norway